Johann Zénon Bernard (13 February 1893 – 25 June 1942) was a Luxembourgian communist politician. He led the Communist Party of Luxembourg during its first two decades of existence, and was the first communist elected to the parliament of Luxembourg. He died in German captivity during the Second World War.

Political activism
Bernard was born in Kahler. He was a metal worker by profession. He joined the socialist movement when the First World War broke out. He became a leading figure in the leftwing faction of the Socialist Party, advocating affiliation to the Communist International. In January 1921, he took part in the founding of the Communist Party of Luxembourg and became the secretary of the Central Committee of the party. In May 1921, he became the party chairman.

Bernard was elected to parliament in the 1934 national election. He was the first Luxembourgian communist elected to parliament. He was, however, barred from occupying his seat by the centre-right majority, on the pretext that as a revolutionary Bernard could not swear on the Constitution.

Resistance and imprisonment
After the German invasion of Luxembourg in the Second World War, Bernard headed the underground activities of the Communist Party. He was arrested by Gestapo in September 1940. Bernard died in German captivity in Kassel.

Sports
Bernard was a football player in his youth. He played for Sporting Club Luxembourg between 1911 and 1914. He played in the Luxembourg national football team twice, against France on 29 October 1911, and again against France on 8 February 1914. In the latter game, a friendly, he scored a goal, and Luxembourg won the match by 5–4, the only time Luxembourg ever beat France.

Streets
Bernard was a resident of Esch-sur-Alzette. A street is named after him in the city, where the Communist Party and its newspaper Zeitung vum Lëtzebuerger Vollek has its offices. There is also a street named after him in Differdange.

References

1893 births
1942 deaths
Communist Party of Luxembourg politicians
Luxembourgian footballers
Luxembourg international footballers
Luxembourg Resistance members
Resistance members killed by Nazi Germany
People from Capellen (canton)
Luxembourgian people who died in Nazi concentration camps
Association football forwards